Vaniputhur is a panchayat town in Erode district in the Indian state of Tamil Nadu.

Demographics
 India census, Vaniputhur had a population of 11,935. Males constitute 50% of the population and females 50%. Vaniputhur has an average literacy rate of 53%, lower than the national average of 59.5%: male literacy is 62%, and female literacy is 44%. In Vaniputhur, 9% of the population is under 6 years of age.

References

Cities and towns in Erode district